Beti is a group of Bantu languages, spoken by the Beti-Pahuin peoples who inhabit the rain forest regions of Cameroon, Republic of the Congo, Equatorial Guinea, Gabon, and São Tomé and Príncipe. The varieties, which are largely mutually intelligible and variously considered dialects or closely related languages, are:
Ewondo (Yaunde)
Fang
Bulu
Eton
Bebele
Bebil
Mengisa

Beti had an ISO 639-3 code, but it was retired in 2010 because the varieties of Beti already had their own codes.

There is a Beti-based pidgin called Ewondo Populaire.

References

 
Languages of Cameroon
Languages of Equatorial Guinea
Languages of Gabon